Jacques Deckousshoud (born 12 May 1964) is a Gabonese footballer. He played in 25 matches for the Gabon national football team from 1993 to 2000. He was also named in Gabon's squad for the 1996 African Cup of Nations tournament.

References

External links
 

1964 births
Living people
Gabonese footballers
Gabon international footballers
1996 African Cup of Nations players
2000 African Cup of Nations players
Place of birth missing (living people)
Association football goalkeepers
21st-century Gabonese people
FC 105 Libreville players